Amylora is a genus of lichenized fungi in the family Trapeliaceae. This is a monotypic genus, containing the single species Amylora cervinocuprea.

References

Baeomycetales
Lichen genera
Baeomycetales genera
Taxa described in 1994